Hyllestad is a municipality in the county of Vestland, Norway. It is located in the traditional district of Sogn. The administrative center is the village of Hyllestad. Other villages in the municipality include Sørbøvågen and Leirvik. Hyllestad municipality has existed since 1862 when it was created from parts of the neighboring municipalities of Askvoll and Lavik. Hyllestad is located on the north side of the Sognefjorden, near the mouth of the fjord.

The  municipality is the 280th largest by area out of the 356 municipalities in Norway. Hyllestad is the 311th most populous municipality in Norway with a population of 1,290.

In 2016, the chief of police for Vestlandet formally suggested a reconfiguration of police districts and stations. He proposed that the police station in Hyllestad be closed.

In the fourth quarter of 2020, there were more than 400 employees at Noryard, a shipyard.

General information

Hyllestad was created as a municipality in 1862. Two sub-parishes from the Askvoll parish (Øn and Hyllestad) and one sub-parish from the Lavik og Brekke parish (Bø) were merged to form a separate municipality which was named Hyllestad. The population at that time in Hyllestad was 2,475. On 1 January 1888, the Krakken farm (population: 17) on the northeastern corner of the island of Sula was transferred from Hyllestad to the neighboring municipality of Utvær. The municipal boundaries have not changed since that time.

On 1 January 2020, the municipality became part of the newly created Vestland county after Sogn og Fjordane and Hordaland counties were merged.

Name
The municipality (originally the parish) is named after the old farm "Hyllestad", since that was where the first Hyllestad Church in the parish was built. The meaning of the first element Hylli is unknown (perhaps an old uncompounded name of the nearby Hyllestadfjorden) and the last element is staðir which means "homestead" or "farm".

Coat of arms
The coat of arms was granted on 10 March 1989. It shows three white millstones on a blue background. The millstones were chosen because the production of millstones is the oldest industry in the municipality and has been very important to the life of the community.

Churches
The Church of Norway has one parish within the municipality of Hyllestad. It is part of the Sunnfjord prosti (deanery) in the Diocese of Bjørgvin.

Government
All municipalities in Norway, including Hyllestad, are responsible for primary education (through 10th grade), outpatient health services, senior citizen services, unemployment and other social services, zoning, economic development, and municipal roads. The municipality is governed by a municipal council of elected representatives, which in turn elect a mayor.  The municipality falls under the Sogn og Fjordane District Court and the Gulating Court of Appeal.

Municipal council
The municipal council  of Hyllestad is made up of 17 representatives that are elected to four year terms. The party breakdown of the council is as follows:

Mayor
The mayor  of a municipality in Norway is a representative of the majority party of the municipal council who is elected to lead the council. The mayors of Hyllestad (incomplete list):
2015–present: Morten Askvik (Sp)
2011-2015: Jan Olav Gjerde (Ap)
2007-2011: Tore Bråstad (Sp)

Geography

Hyllestad is located north of the Sognefjorden along the Åfjorden/Hyllestadfjorden, which flows through the middle of the municipality. Hyllestad is bordered to the north by the municipality of Fjaler, to the east by Høyanger, to the south (across the fjord) by Gulen, and to the west by the island municipality of Solund.

Attractions

Kvernsteins Millstone Park
The production of millstones in Hyllestad started over 1,000 years ago and used to be a major industry employing up to 1,000 people. Millstones were exported to Denmark, the Baltic Sea region, and across Norway. Many of the stone crosses to be seen along the coast are made from millstones from Hyllestad, including the crosses in Eivindvik and Korssund. The park offers nature trails that visualize the history of the industry, with debris, broken product, and half-carved stones still not separated from the rock surface. At the stonemason camp there is a guided tour of the historic stone quarry in the mill stone park and a visit to Åfjordstein where you can see how mill stones are used in a modern, new design.

Lihesten
The majestic and bewitching Lihesten is one of the most prominent mountains on the coast of Norway. Lihesten also has a number of good fishing lakes.

Trondheim Postal Road
Many bicyclists have described the well-preserved section of the Trondheim postal road between Hyllestad and Fjaler as one of the most exhilarating cycling experiences in the country. There were originally 19 stone bridges on the route between the villages of Dale and Leirvik, and many of them are still standing as proud and impressive examples of early dry masonry. There are only a few places along the  stretch between Dale in Fjaler and Leirvik in Hyllestad where the surface is so uneven that it is best to push a bike rather than ride it. Occasionally it is necessary to join the paved road (Fylkesvei 57), but most of the route is free from cars and idyllic.

Water Mills
On the postroad, by Skor, lies a beautiful cluster of five authentic, newly renovated gristmills.

Notable residents
 Anfin Øen (1868–1928) a Norwegian bailiff and politician
 Ivar Tveit (1880–1952) a Norwegian newspaper editor
 Håkon Steinar Giil (born 1943), a politician and former mayor of Hyllestad 1987-1993

References

External links

Municipal fact sheet from Statistics Norway 

 
Municipalities of Vestland
1862 establishments in Norway